WYCR (98.5 FM, "Rocky 98.5") is a commercial radio station licensed to serve York-Hanover, Pennsylvania. The station is owned by Forever Media, through licensee FM Radio Licenses, LLC, and broadcasts a classic rock format.

WYCR programming is simulcast on sister station WRKY and WRKY's translator on 92.5 MHz in Lancaster, Pennsylvania.

WYCR airs Nights with Alice Cooper on weekdays and The House of Hair with Dee Snider on Saturdays.

History
The Federal Communications Commission granted Radio Hanover, Inc. a construction permit for the station on June 15, 1960 with the WHVR-FM call sign. The station was granted its first license on December 27, 1962 by which time the call sign had been changed to WYCR.

On December 14, 2004, the station changed formats from contemporary hit radio (CHR) to classic hits, and switched branding from "98YCR" to "98.5 The Peak".

On March 1, 2016, Radio Hanover Inc. sold WYCR (and WHVR) to Forever Media for $2.6 million. The new owner changed WYCR's format to classic rock and re-branded the station as "Rocky 98.5" on April 25, 2016.

Following the consummation of Forever Media's purchase of WONN-FM, WLPA and WLPA's translator on October 15, 2021, WLPA and its translator began a simulcast of WYCR programming. WLPA’s call sign was subsequently changed to WRKY effective November 1, 2021.

Simulcast
One AM station simulcasts the programming of WYCR:

Signal note
WYCR is short-spaced to two other Class B stations:

WKRZ 98.5 KRZ (licensed to serve Freeland, Pennsylvania) operates on the same channel as WYCR and the distance between the stations' transmitters is 110 miles as determined by FCC rules. The minimum distance between two Class B stations operating on the same channel according to current FCC rules is 150 miles.

WMZQ-FM 98.7 WMZQ (licensed to serve Washington, D.C.) operates on 98.7 MHz, a first adjacent channel to WYCR, and the distance between the stations' transmitters is 68 miles as determined by FCC rules. The minimum distance between two Class B stations operating on first adjacent channels according to current FCC rules is 105 miles.

References

External links
 
 

YCR
Classic rock radio stations in the United States
Radio stations established in 1962
1962 establishments in Pennsylvania